Hilary Barte (born November 17, 1988) is an American professional tennis player.

College
Barte played #1 singles and made All-American in singles and doubles all four years while at Stanford.  She won the NCAA doubles title with Mallory Burdette at the 2011 NCAA Championships, having previously won the title with Mallory's sister Lindsay in 2010.

Career
Barte has won one ITF tournament, a $10,000 donated tournament in Ciudad Obregón. In the final she beat Erika Clarke of Mexico.

She competed at the 2011 US Open Doubles Tournament as a wildcard entrant with her partner Mallory Burdette. In the first round they beat Glatch/Hampton of the United States. They lost in the second round to Andreja Klepač from Slovenia and Anna Tatishvili from Georgia.

References

External links
 
 

American female tennis players
1988 births
Living people
Stanford Cardinal women's tennis players